Enes bakeri is a species of beetle in the family Cerambycidae. It was described by Fisher in 1925.

References

Acanthocinini
Beetles described in 1925